The Central District of Isfahan County is a district (bakhsh) in Isfahan County, Isfahan Province, Iran. At the 2006 census, its population was 1,860,674, in 515,487 families.  The District has six cities: Isfahan, Baharestan, Dorcheh Piaz, Khvorasgan, Ziar & Qahjaverestan. The District has seven rural districts (dehestan): Baraan-e Jonubi Rural District, Baraan-e Shomali Rural District, Jey Rural District, Keraj Rural District, Mahmudabad Rural District, Qahab-e Jonubi Rural District, and Qahab-e Shomali Rural District.

References 

Isfahan County
Districts of Isfahan Province